Smithereens means tiny pieces. It may also refer to:
 Smithereens (film), a 1982 film by Susan Seidelman
 The Smithereens, a rock band from New Jersey
 Smithereens (book) a book by Shaun Micallef
 Natives of Smithers, a town in Canada
 Smithereens (album), a 2022 album by Joji
 Smithereens, a 1998 album by Nick Harper, or the title track
 Smithereens, an album by Elin Sigvardsson
 "Smithereens", a 2018 song by Twenty One Pilots from the album Trench
 "Smithereens" (Black Mirror), an episode of Black Mirror